Xia Chuzhong (30 May 1904 – 28 December 1988) was a KMT general from Yiyang, Hunan province. He participated in many battles during the Second Sino-Japanese War, including the Battle of Shanghai. He died in Taipei, Taiwan in 1988.

References

National Revolutionary Army generals from Hunan
People from Yiyang
1904 births
1988 deaths